Cheshmeh-ye Baha ol Din (also Romanized as Cheshmeh-ye Bahā’ ol Dīn, Chashmeh Baha ud Dīn, Cheshmeh Bāhā’ed Dīn, Cheshmeh-ye Bahā’ ed Dīn, and Cheshmeh-ye Bahā‘ od Dīn) is a village in Satar Rural District, Kolyai District, Sonqor County, Kermanshah Province, Iran. At the 2006 census, its population was 265 and included 70 families.

References 

Populated places in Sonqor County